This table lists players with 10 or more wins on the LPGA Tour. It is based on the list on the LPGA Tour's official site, which differs slightly from the main win lists on player's personal profiles on the site. The wins counted here include professional titles won before the tour was founded in 1950; and LPGA Tour events won as an amateur, or as an international invitee before joining the LPGA Tour. They do not include team events, unofficial events, or official wins on other professional tours, of which a few of the golfers listed, such as Laura Davies and Annika Sörenstam, have many.

The list is complete as of March 5, 2023. Members of the World Golf Hall of Fame are annotated HoF. Golfers listed in bold are active on the LPGA Tour as of 2023.

"T" indicates tied for ranking position

References

External links
LPGA Tour All-Time Winners List (complete through 2007)
LPGA - Official career wins (missing Susie Berning)

LPGA Tour
 A
LPGA Tour
LPGA Tour wins